Chhena kheeri is a sweet dish originally from coastal Odisha in eastern India.

Preparation
Chhena kheeri is made by deep frying cubes of chhena cheese. Although typically ghee, traditional clarified butter, is used as the frying medium, chefs frequently substitute this with vegetable oil. The cubes are added to milk and sugar, and boiled further until some of the milk evaporates and the dish acquires a thicker consistency, to form a rabdi. The mixture is seasoned with cardamoms and nuts before being served.

See also

Chhena gaja
Rasagolla
Chhena poda
Khira sagara
Rasaballi
Chhena jalebi
Odia cuisine

References

Indian cheese dishes
Indian desserts
Odia cuisine